Killukin, sometimes known as Killucan, is a civil parish in the barony of Boyle, County Roscommon in Ireland. It is located on the road from Carrick-on-Shannon to Elphin containing part of the market and post town of Carrick (with which it is connected by a bridge over the River Shannon). It is bounded on the north by the parish of Toomna, on the west by the parishes of Eastersnow and Ardcarne, on the south by the parish of Killummond, and on the east by the River Shannon.

Name
Killukin, which derives from Cill-ibhicin in Irish and is pronounced Kill-Evickeen, relates to a church (or cill) and a saint or person associated with that church. The saint seems to be the person whom the catalogue of the churches of the Diocese of Elphin calls Lunecharia and asserts to be venerated on 7 June in a certain chapel of the same diocese called Kill Lunechair which lies near the Episcopal See.

The place possibly began as a hermitage in times soon after St. Patrick.  Local tradition claims that there was a monastic settlement in the field between Cordrehid Road and the graveyard road and a round tower.

References

Civil parishes of County Roscommon